Natsuko Yamamoto (山本奈津子 Yamamoto Natsuko) is a Japanese actress.

Filmography
セーラー服百合族 (Seiraafuku yurizoku) (1983)
セーラー服百合族２  (Seiraafuku yurizoku 2) (1983)
 (1984)
夕ぐれ族 (Yuugurezoku) (1984)
不純な関係 (Fujun na kankei) (1984)
ロリータ妻　微熱 (1984)
OL百合族 19歳 (OL yurizoku jyukyu sai) (1984)
The Shogunate's Harem (大奥十八景; Ooku jyuhakkei) (1986)
春らんまん結婚記 (Haruranmen kekkon-ki?) (1987)
花園の迷宮(1988)

絶対やせる　電エース　宇宙大怪獣ギララ登場！／宇宙怪獣小進撃！(2007)

External links
Official site (in Japanese)

JMDb profile (in Japanese)

Japanese actresses
Living people
Year of birth missing (living people)